Battaristis melanamba is a moth of the family Gelechiidae. It was described by Edward Meyrick in 1914. It is found in Guyana.

The wingspan is about 9 mm. The forewings are leaden grey, finely sprinkled with whitish with black dots beneath the fold before one-fourth and before the middle. The costal edge is black from the base to a minute black strigula at one-fifth and there are two adjacent flattened-triangular black costal patches extending from about one-third to four-fifths, separated by an oblique whitish strigula. There are two or three indistinct minute black pre-marginal dots near the termen. The hindwings are dark fuscous.

References

Battaristis
Taxa named by Edward Meyrick
Moths described in 1914